Moazzam (from Arabic ) may refer to:

Moazzam Jah Ansari, officer of the Police Service of Pakistan
Moazzam Begg (born 1968), British Pakistani held in Guantanamo Bay detainment camp
Moazzam Ilyas (born 1965), HI(M), SI(M), two-star rank admiral in the Pakistan Navy
Moazzam Jah, KCIE (1907–1987), the son of the last Nizam of Hyderabad
Moazzam Ali Khan, Pakistani politician
Moazzam Malik (born 1994), Pakistani cricketer
Moazzam Malik (diplomat) CMG is a British civil servant and diplomat
Moazzam Pahalwan or Bholu Brothers, Pakistani wrestlers of Kashmiri origin
Moazzam Jahanzeb Wattoo, Pakistani politician, Member of the Provincial Assembly of the Punjab

See also
Moazzam Jahi Market, fruit market in Hyderabad, Telangana, India
 Al-Mu'azzam (disambiguation) (al-Mo'azzam)